Nicholas Bruckman is an American documentary filmmaker. He is best known for his work on the documentaries La Americana and Not Going Quietly.

Life and career
Bruckman was born in London. He graduated from SUNY Purchase. He is the founder of People's Television, an independent film and commercial production company.

In 2008, Bruckman directed his debut feature documentary, La Americana, which aired worldwide on networks including National Geographic and Al Jazeera. In 2012, he produced the feature film, Valley of Saints, which won the Audience Award at the Sundance Film Festival. In 2021, he directed the documentary film, Not Going Quietly, which premiered at South by Southwest where it won the Audience Award.

Filmography

Awards and nominations

References

External links
 
 

Living people
American documentary filmmakers
American documentary film directors
American documentary film producers
American film producers
Year of birth missing (living people)